Maricaban may refer to the following places in the Philippines:

 Maricaban Island, the main island that composes most of the municipality of Tingloy in the province of Batangas
 Marikaban, barangay in the municipality of Tingloy in the province of Batangas
 Maricaban Strait, which separates Maricaban Island (Tingloy) from the mainland of Luzon
 Maricaban Island, islet in the municipality of Quezon in the province of Palawan
 Maricaban, barangay in the municipality of Santa Fe in the province of Cebu
 Maricaban Bay, bay on the north shore of Busuanga Island in the province of Palawan